"Lady" is a song written by Graeham Goble and performed by Australian rock music group Little River Band. It was released in September 1978 as the third and final single from their fourth studio album, Sleeper Catcher. The song peaked at number 46 on the Australian Kent Music Report singles chart. The song also peaked at No. 10 on the Billboard Hot 100.

Goble said "A girl (I never met) inspired "Lady" when she danced in front of Mississippi at the Matthew Flinders Hotel, Melbourne 1973."

Track listings
 Australian 7" (EMI 11800)
A. "Lady" - 3:31
B. "Happy Anniversary"

 New Zealand 7" (EMI 1036)
A. "Lady" - 3:31	
B. "So Many Paths" - 5:07	

 North American 7" (Harvest 4667)
A. "Lady" - 3:31	
B. "So Many Paths" - 5:07	

 Spanish version (OZ Records 10C 006-082647)
A. "Señorita"	- 3:55
B. "Recordando" - 4:11

Charts

Weekly charts

Year-end charts

References

External links
 

Little River Band songs
1978 singles
Song recordings produced by John Boylan (record producer)
1978 songs
EMI Records singles
Harvest Records singles
Songs written by Graeham Goble